Randy Paul Andrew Boissonnault  (born July 14, 1970) is a Canadian politician who has served as Minister of Tourism and Associate Minister of Finance since October 26, 2021. A member of the Liberal Party, he represents the riding of Edmonton Centre in the House of Commons. Boissonnault was initially elected as the Member of Parliament (MP) in the 2015 federal election and served until his defeat in 2019. He later went on to win back his seat in the 2021 federal election. He was one of five openly gay MPs elected in 2015 and the first to be elected from Alberta.

Early life
Boissonnault was born in the Franco-Albertan town of Morinville, Alberta on July 14, 1970.

After graduating from the University of Alberta, Boissonault studied at the University of Oxford as a Rhodes Scholar. He subsequently worked as a lecturer at the University of Alberta's Campus Saint-Jean and as a journalist and political commentator for Radio-Canada and Les Affaires.

Political career
Boissonnault was elected in the 2015 election in the riding of Edmonton Centre, the first Liberal MP to win in the riding for almost a decade.

Upon being sworn in as a Member of Parliament, Boissonnault was named Parliamentary Secretary to the Minister of Canadian Heritage.

On November 15, 2016, Boissonnault was named special advisor on LGBTQ2 issues to the Prime Minister. The role involves advising Trudeau "on the development and co-ordination of the Government of Canada’s LGBTQ2 agenda" including protecting LGBT rights in Canada and addressing both present and historical discrimination.

He was defeated in the 2019 election. On July 14, 2021, he was acclaimed as the Edmonton Centre Liberal candidate for the next Canadian federal election. He won the election on September 20, 2021, defeating James Cumming, who had previously defeated him in 2019.

In Cabinet 
Boissonnault was appointed the minister of tourism and associate minister of finance in a Cabinet shuffle following the 2021 federal election.

Election results

References

External links
 

1970 births
Alumni of University College, Oxford
Canadian LGBT Members of Parliament
Canadian Rhodes Scholars
Franco-Albertan people
Gay politicians
Liberal Party of Canada MPs
Living people
Members of the House of Commons of Canada from Alberta
Politicians from Edmonton
University of Alberta alumni
Academic staff of the University of Alberta
21st-century Canadian politicians
Members of the King's Privy Council for Canada
21st-century Canadian LGBT people
Canadian gay men